Sayyid Fahd bin Mahmoud Al-Said (born 1940) is the Deputy Prime Minister for the Council of Ministers in the Sultanate of Oman, and has served in this post since 23 June 1972. He was also the spokesperson of the Royal Family Council at least on the extraordinary session upon the death of Sultan Qaboos bin Said.

Sayyid Fahd is married to a French Woman and has a son and a daughter, Kamel bin Fahd and Mona bint Fahd.

References

Al Said dynasty
1940 births
Living people
People from Muscat, Oman
Omani Ibadi Muslims
Government ministers of Oman
20th-century Omani people